Deer Pond is an  pond in Plymouth, Massachusetts. The pond is located southeast of Fawn Pond and northwest of the eastern basin of White Island Pond.

References

External links
Environmental Protection Agency

Ponds of Plymouth, Massachusetts
Ponds of Massachusetts